Merrill  Joseph Fernando (born 6 May 1930) is the founder and former CEO of the Sri Lankan tea company Dilmah. In 2019, Fernando stood down as CEO of Dilmah and was succeeded by his son Dilhan Fernando.

Early life
Fernando was born in Pallansena, Negombo, British Ceylon in 1930. Fernando attended Maris Stella College in Negombo and Saint Joseph's College, Colombo in his youth. His first job was as a inspector for a U.S. petroleum company.

Career
Fernando was one of the first Sri Lankan tea tasters to be selected to learn about tea in Mincing Lane, London. Up until this time, the prevailing colonial system did not believe Sri Lankans were capable of assessing tea as they felt they ate too much curry which would affect their assessment of the taste. However, Fernando was one of five who were selected and trained in London.

Further reading

  
  
 The Teamaker (2009). Dilmah Publication.
 "https://www.dilmahtea.com/70-years-of-tea-inspiration/"

References

Sinhalese businesspeople
Businesspeople in tea
Sri Lankan Roman Catholics
Sri Lankan environmentalists
1930 births
Living people